Citrio is an adware web browser developed by Catalina Group Ltd. and distributed by Epom Ad Server. Citrio is available for Windows and Mac OS X. Citrio has a download manager that includes Bittorrent support, a video downloader, a media player and a proxy switcher. Citrio is based on the open source Chromium web browser project, which makes it compatible with all extensions, apps and themes from Chrome Web Store.

Citrio is known to trigger warnings from antivirus software, as it downloads privacy-invading extensions in the background and all users' data is tracked and collected by Epom for the purpose of selling ads; this has led some to categorize Citrio as adware.

Features
Citrio has a built-in download manager that allows to pause and resume downloads, sorts downloaded files by date, type and download status. The browser has an inbuilt BitTorrent client which allows to download torrent files and magnet links without additional software. Citrio’s video grabber makes it possible to download files from multiple online video websites. Downloaded torrents and videos are displayed together with the other downloads in a respective section in the browser. A built-in media player can play video files while their download is still in progress. Citrio has a built-in ad blocking extension.

History and development
Citrio browser is distributed by Epom Ad Server and developed by Catalina Group. Citrio was initially released in 2013 with a number of its core features, such as the download manager, torrent manager, video downloader and proxy switcher.

Release history
 38.0.2125.244 - Social sharing extension added; redesigned download manager page.
 39.0.2171.248 - Option to edit torrents after the download has been started; free Premium account on file hosting service 4shared.
 41.0.2272.254 - Media player introduced that enabled to watch videos in the process of the download.
 42.0.2311.258 - Added audio extractor option for converting video to mp3.
 44.0.2403.264 - Playlists supports has been added to the media player for video and audio files.
 44.0.2403.265 - ad-blocking extension has been added.
 50.0.2661.273 - Latest with proxy and download manager

Reception
Citrio has been generally well-reviewed for its downloading capabilities, such as the download manager, torrent and video downloader.

Others have criticized it as adware and a security risk, with misleading promotional materials and privacy-invading user data collection.

In February 2015, CNET reviewed Citrio with the following conclusion: “...if you download a lot of media files from the Internet, you should definitely give Citrio a try. It offers one of the easiest ways we've seen to download files, and, aside from the Ask [toolbar] "optimization," there was a lot to like in this free browser.”

Softonic's review of Citrio similarly concludes: "Although Citrio is promoted as a secure browser, the installation of the programme is known to set off malware warnings and is can be considered adware. You also are unable to opt out of installing the privacy-invading Ask toolbar during the initial installation. There is still a lot to like about this browser...."

References

External links 
 

Windows web browsers
MacOS web browsers